Jeanine is a given name. Notable people with the name include:

Jeanine Áñez (born 1967), Bolivian politician and lawyer who served as Interim President of Bolivia from 2019 to 2020
Jeanine Bapst (born 1968), Swiss ski mountaineer
Jeanine Basinger (born 1936), Corwin-Fuller Professor of Film Studies at Wesleyan University, Middletown, Connecticut
Jeanine Cicognini (born 1986), badminton player
Jeanine Corbet, American filmmaker
Jeanine Delpech (1905–1992), French journalist, translator, novelist
Jeanine Hennis-Plasschaert (born 1973), Dutch politician and former management consultant and civil servant
Jeanine Mason (born 1991), American dancer and winner of So You Think You Can Dance 2009
Jeanine Meerapfel (born 1943), German film director and screenwriter
Jeanine Menze the first African-American female in the United States Coast Guard to earn the Coast Guard Aviation Designation
Jeanine Perry, former member of the Ohio House of Representatives, succeeded by Matt Szollosi
Jeanine Pirro (born 1951), American lawyer, prosecutor, TV host, former Judge, and politician from the state of New York
Jeanine Rueff (born 1922), French composer and music educator
Jeanine Tesori (formerly known as Jeanine Levenson), a composer of musicals

Other uses
 A brand name of a medication containing ethinylestradiol and dienogest

See also
Jeanine Nicarico murder case, homicide investigation and prosecution in DuPage County, Illinois
Jeannine
Janine (given name)
Jeananne